Sylvirana nigrovittata, also known as the black-striped frog, black-spotted stream frog, sapgreen stream frog, etc., is a species of frog in the family Ranidae. It is found in northeastern India, Bangladesh, Nepal, southern China, Myanmar, Thailand, Cambodia, Laos, and Vietnam. The species was redelimited in 2018, and earlier literature may refer to other species; identifications from India and Bangladesh are still uncertain.

Sylvirana nigrovittata occurs in gentle streams in evergreen forest, including evergreen galleries in deciduous forest areas. The tadpoles develop quiet stream sections. It is a common species. It is threatened by the loss of forest canopy over streams it inhabits, as well as hydrological changes. It is not considered threatened by the IUCN.

References

nigrovittata
Amphibians of Bangladesh
Amphibians of Cambodia
Amphibians of China
Frogs of India
Amphibians of Laos
Amphibians of Myanmar
Amphibians of Nepal
Amphibians of Thailand
Amphibians of Vietnam
Amphibians described in 1856
Taxa named by Edward Blyth